John Albert "Automatic Jack" Manders (January 13, 1909 – January 29, 1977) was an American football player. He played professionally in the National Football League (NFL) for the Chicago Bears from 1933 to 1940. He's considered pro football's first kicking specialist. 

Manders considered one of the biggest stars of the NFL early years, and was the second pro football player to appear on a Wheaties box. He was also a member of the Chicago team coached by George Halas that defeated the Washington Redskins in the 1940 NFL Championship Game by the memorable score of 73–0.

He was the older brother of Clarence "Pug" Manders.

References

1909 births
1977 deaths
American football fullbacks
American football halfbacks
American football placekickers
Chicago Bears players
Minnesota Golden Gophers football players
Players of American football from Chicago
People from Milbank, South Dakota